AMX may refer to:

Companies and finance
 AMX LLC, a manufacturer of commercial and residential control systems
 AMX index (Amsterdam Midkap Index), a stock market index of Euronext Amsterdam
 América Móvil (Mexican Stock Exchange ticker symbol: AMX), Mexican telecommunications company
 Armenia Securities Exchange, a stock exchange operating in Armenia

Aviation and military
 Aeroméxico (ICAO airline designator: AMX), a Mexican airline
 AMX International AMX, a fighter aircraft
 AMX International, the company that makes the AMX aircraft
 Ateliers de construction d'Issy-les-Moulineaux, French construction workshop that builds armored vehicles
 AMX-50, heavy tank
 AMX-30, main battle tank
 AMX-13, light tank
 AMX-10 RC, armored fighting vehicle
 AMX Leclerc, main battle tank

Technology
 AMX192, a lighting control standard
 Advanced Matrix Extensions, an Intel Sapphire Rapids processor feature

Other uses
 AMX Mod, a server-side modification for Half-Life games
 AMC AMX, a sports car made by American Motors Corporation